Phillimore is the surname of:

People:
Augustus Phillimore (1822–1897), Royal Navy admiral
Claud Phillimore, 4th Baron Phillimore (1911–1994), English architect
Egerton Phillimore (1856–1937), British scholar of Welsh literature and language
Greville Phillimore (1821–1884), British Anglican priest and hymnal compiler
Henry Phillimore (1910–1974), English barrister and judge
John Phillimore (1781–1840), Royal Navy captain
John George Phillimore (1808–1865), English barrister, jurist and politician
John Swinnerton Phillimore (1873–1926), British classical scholar, translator, and poet
Joseph Phillimore (1775–1855), English civil lawyer, politician and Regius Professor of Civil Law at Oxford
Richard Phillimore (1864–1940), Royal Navy admiral
Robert Phillimore, 1st Baronet (1810–1885), English judge and politician
Stephen Phillimore (1881–1956), Anglican Archdeacon of Middlesex
Walter Phillimore, 1st Baron Phillimore (1845–1929), British lawyer and judge, Lord Justice of Appeal
William Phillimore Watts Phillimore (1853–1913), lawyer, genealogist, and publisher, the founder of Phillimore & Co. Ltd

Fictional characters:
James Phillimore, whose disappearance is mentioned as an unsolved Sherlock Holmes case

See also
Millard Fillmore (1800–1874), thirteenth President of the United States (1850 to 1853), last President of the Whig Party